Hari Raj Limbu is a Nepalese politician, belonging to the Communist Party of Nepal. In April 2008, he won the Dhankuta-2 seat in the Constituent Assembly election.

References

Living people
Year of birth missing (living people)
Communist Party of Nepal (Maoist Centre) politicians
Nepalese atheists

Members of the 1st Nepalese Constituent Assembly